This is a list of khanates, empires and kingdoms who predominantly followed Tengrism, a Central Asian shamanistic religion.

 Xiongnu (209 BCE–93 CE)
 Xianbei state (93BCE–234)
 Rouran Khaganate (330–555)
 Huns (370s–469) 
 First Turkic Khaganate (552–659)
 Old Great Bulgaria (632–668)
 Volga Bulgaria (7th century–922)
 Khazar Khaganate (650–740)
 First Bulgarian Empire (681–864)
 Second Turkic Khaganate (682–744)
 Tatar confederation (8th century-1202)
 Uyghur Khaganate (744–840)
 Oghuz Yabgu State (766–1055)
 Kara-Khanid Khanate (840–934)
 Pecheneg Khanates (860-1091)
 Principality of Hungary (895–1000) 
 Cumans
 Cumania (10th century-1241)
 Taichiud
 Khamag Mongol (10th century-1206)
 Merkits (11th century-1200)
 Mongol Empire (1206–1368)

See also
 Tengrism

References

Tengriism
Tengrist